Nicu Paleru (born April 23, 1973, Pitești, Muntenia) is a well-known Romanian manele musician. Part of the party music since the early 1990s, he finally attained national success in the late 1990s with the help of a Romanian TV show dedicated to party music.

References 

1973 births
Living people
People from Pitești